Treadwell Street Historic District is a national historic district located at Orangeburg, Orangeburg County, South Carolina. The district encompasses 39 contributing buildings in an African American residential section of Orangeburg. They include one-story, weatherboard frame dwellings dated between about 1890 and 1930.  The houses are in a variety of popular architectural styles including Victorian and Bungalow.

It was added to the National Register of Historic Places in 1985.

References

Houses on the National Register of Historic Places in South Carolina
Historic districts on the National Register of Historic Places in South Carolina
Victorian architecture in South Carolina
Houses in Orangeburg County, South Carolina
National Register of Historic Places in Orangeburg County, South Carolina